The Walgerbach is a river of district Marburg-Biedenkopf in Hesse, Germany. It flows into the Wenkbach near Niederwalgern.

See also 
 List of rivers of Hesse

Rivers of Hesse
Rivers of Germany